Borislav Pilipović (Serbian Cyrillic: Борислав Пилиповић; born 25 March 1984 in Bihać) is a Bosnian-Herzegovinian football player currently playing as a defender for German amateur side KSV Tempo Frankfurt.

References

1985 births
Living people
People from Bihać
Association football defenders
Bosnia and Herzegovina footballers
FK Borac Banja Luka players
NK Žminj players
NK Istra 1961 players
NK Karlovac players
NK Slaven Belupo players
NK Vitez players
Croatian Football League players
Premier League of Bosnia and Herzegovina players
Bosnia and Herzegovina expatriate footballers
Expatriate footballers in Croatia
Bosnia and Herzegovina expatriate sportspeople in Croatia
Expatriate footballers in Germany
Bosnia and Herzegovina expatriate sportspeople in Germany